Madison Fitzpatrick (born 14 December 1996) is an Australian field hockey player.

Fitzpatrick was born in Cabarita Beach, New South Wales, and made her senior international debut in a test series against Korea in September 2015.

Fitzpatrick was part of the Australian women's junior national team 'The Jillaroos' that won bronze at the 2016 Hockey Junior World Cup in Chile, as well as the Jillaroos team at the 2013 Hockey Junior World Cup.

Fitzpatrick qualified for the Tokyo 2020 Olympics. She was part of the Hockeyroos Olympics squad. The Hockeyroos lost 1-0 to India in the quarterfinals and therefore were not in medal contention.

Personal life
Madison Fitzpatrick comes from a hockey family, with each member of her family having played at a representative level. Her father Scott and sister Savannah both having represented Australia, while her mother, Margie and siblings Callum and Kendra all having represented at state levels.

At the 2016 Hockey Junior World Cup, Madison and Savannah played together in the Jillaroos team that won bronze.

Playing career

Senior national team
 2015 Oceania Cup in Stratford, New Zealand – 1st
 2014–15 Hockey World League Final in Rosario, Argentina – 6th

International goals

References

External links
 
 
 

1996 births
Living people
Australian female field hockey players
Female field hockey defenders
Field hockey players at the 2020 Summer Olympics
Field hockey players at the 2022 Commonwealth Games
Olympic field hockey players of Australia
20th-century Australian women
21st-century Australian women
Commonwealth Games medallists in field hockey
Commonwealth Games silver medallists for Australia
Sportswomen from New South Wales
Sportspeople from Sydney
Medallists at the 2022 Commonwealth Games